Shahrixon District is a tuman (district) of Andijan Region in Uzbekistan. The capital lies at the city Shahrixon.

The district consists of 1 city (Shahrixon), 3 urban-type settlements (Vaxim, Choʻja and Segazaqum) and 12 rural communities (incl. Nazarmaxram).

The kishlak of Nazarmaxram, located in the district, was the district center of Xoldevonbek District, abolished in 1962.

References

Districts of Uzbekistan
Andijan Region